Essi Wuorela is a Finnish soprano. She is an original member of the ensemble Rajaton, founded in 1997, but also began a solo career in 1994. She studied music at Sibelius High School and later Helsinki Pop & Jazz Conservatory, from which she graduated as a music teacher in 1999. Before her singing career Wuorela was known as the presenter of the Finnish children's television programme Harlekiini-klubi as Super-Essi.

Discography
 Mitä tarkoittaa rakas (1994)
 Pala taivasta (1995)
 Hellyys (1997)
 Helsinki Haiku Song Pictures (2000)
 Valo (2006)

Collaborations
 1992: Samuli Edelmann album Yön Valot
 1995: CMX song Veden Ääri
 1996: Don Huonot song Kaunis Painajainen.
 1997: Luunelonen song Tässä Olen Nyt
 2008: Open Eye Band songs My Island, So Long Ago, My Island part II and End of the Party

References

External links
 

1971 births
Living people
21st-century Finnish women singers